Parliamentary elections were held in Ukraine on 31 March 2002. The Our Ukraine bloc emerged as the largest faction in the Verkhovna Rada, winning 113 of the 450 seats.

The Organization for Security and Co-operation in Europe noted at the time that there were physical assaults and harassment of candidates and campaign workers associated with opposition political parties prior to the March election. The Yulia Tymoshenko Bloc complained of campaign related violations including "an informal 'media blackout,' [and] negatively slanted coverage".

Electoral system
In this election, parallel voting was used. Half of the deputies to Verkhovna Rada (parliament of Ukraine) were elected on proportional basis, while the other half were elected by popular vote in single-mandate constituencies. In order to gain any (proportional) seats in Verkhovna Rada a party needed to receive at least 4% of the popular vote.

Opinion polls

Conduct
On 29 March 2002 the Bloc of Yulia Tymoshenko won a case on defamation against the Chairman of the Tax Administration of Ukraine Mykola Azarov. The Shevchenkivsky District Court of the Kyiv city prohibited the Tax Administration of Ukraine to spread lies against the opposition electoral bloc.

Late at night on 29 March 2002 vice-governor of the Ivano-Frankivsk Oblast Mykola Shkriblyak was mortally wounded. Shkriblyak was a member of the Social Democratic Party of Ukraine (united) and he was a parliamentary candidate in the 90th electoral district. He died later in a local hospital.

Results
The final election results differed greatly from the final opinion poll. The 2002 parliamentary elections were the first that substantially reduced fragmentation of the Verkhovna Rada and laid the groundwork for consolidation of political views in the parliament.

Yushchenko's Our Ukraine gathered most of its support from western and central regions of Ukraine, including the city of Kyiv. The Communist Party received most of its votes from eastern and southern regions, as well as from Crimea. For United Ukraine block, which included Victor Yanukovych's Party of Regions, got most of its votes from eastern regions of Ukraine. Donetsk Oblast was the stronghold of the block, where it received more than twice the number of votes (36.83%) compared to the next highest supporting region: Sumy Oblast with 17.05% of the region's voters. Yulia Tymoshenko's block's support came predominantly from western regions, while the Socialists were most supported in the central regions. While the Tymoshenko block received more of the national vote compared to the Socialist Party, it did not gain a plurality in any of the regions, while the Socialist Party managed to secure plurality of votes in Poltava Oblast with 22.05%.

By electoral district
The following table demonstrates all winners of the 225 electoral districts.

Several lawmakers elected into the new parliament have family ties with other lawmakers or other family members in the executive branch of Ukrainian politics.

Faction changes after the 2002 elections
After the election, several MPs left their parties to join another others.

|-
|style="background-color:#E9E9E9" align=left valign=top|Parties and alliances
!style="background-color:#E9E9E9"|Number of seats on 15 May 2002
!style="background-color:#E9E9E9"|Number of seats on 19 October 2002
!style="background-color:#E9E9E9" align=center|Number of seats on 2 January 2003
!style="background-color:#E9E9E9" align=center|Number of seats on 16 September 2005
!style="background-color:#E9E9E9" align=center|  
|-
|align=left|Viktor Yushchenko Bloc Our Ukraine
|valign=top|119
|valign=top|110
|valign=top|102
|valign=top|45
|valign=top| 74 seats
|-
|align=left|Communist Party of Ukraine
|valign=top|64
|valign=top|61
|valign=top|60
|valign=top|56
|valign=top| 8 seats
|-
|align=left|For United Ukraine
|valign=top|175
|valign=top|Disbanded 
|valign=top|Disbanded 
|valign=top|Disbanded 
|valign=top| 175 seats
|-
|align=left|Electoral Bloc Yuliya Tymoshenko
|valign=top|23
|valign=top|20
|valign=top|18
|valign=top|40
|valign=top| 17 seats
|-
|align=left|Socialist Party of Ukraine
|valign=top|22
|valign=top|21
|valign=top|20
|valign=top|26
|valign=top| 4 seats
|-
|align=left|United Social Democratic Party of Ukraine
|valign=top|31
|valign=top|38
|valign=top|40
|valign=top|20
|valign=top| 11 seats
|-
|colspan=6 align=left|Source: Virtual Politics - Faking Democracy in the Post-Soviet World, Andrew Wilson, Yale University Press, 2005,  & Ukraine on Its Meandering Path Between East and West by Andrej Lushnycky and Mykola Riabchuk, Peter Lang, 2009,  & Ukraine at the Crossroads: Velvet Revolution or Belarusification by Olexiy Haran, National University of Kyiv-Mohyla Academy, October 2002
|}

By October 2002 the For United Ukraine faction had broken down in 8 new parliamentary factions.

References

External links
Central Election Commission of Ukraine
Relatively in-depth analysis of the election GlobalSecurity.org

Parliamentary elections in Ukraine
Ukraine
Parliamentary election
Parliamentary
4th Ukrainian Verkhovna Rada